The 2014 WTA Awards are a series of awards given by the Women's Tennis Association to players who have achieved something remarkable during the 2014 WTA Tour.

The awards
These awards are decided by either the media, the players, the association, or the fans. Nominees were announced by the WTA's Twitter account.

Note: award winners in bold

Player of the Year
 Li Na
 Simona Halep
 Serena Williams
 Maria Sharapova
 Petra Kvitová
 Ana Ivanovic

Doubles Team of the Year
 Cara Black &  Sania Mirza
 Sara Errani &  Roberta Vinci
 Ekaterina Makarova &  Elena Vesnina
 Hsieh Su-wei &  Peng Shuai

Most Improved Player of the Year
 Caroline Garcia
 Coco Vandeweghe
 Eugenie Bouchard
 Karolína Plíšková
 Casey Dellacqua

Newcomer of the Year
 Shelby Rogers
 Kurumi Nara
 Zarina Diyas
 Belinda Bencic

Comeback Player of the Year
 Jarmila Gajdošová
 Timea Bacsinszky
 Garbiñe Muguruza
 Maria Sharapova
 Mirjana Lučić-Baroni
 Heather Watson

Diamond Aces
 Petra Kvitová

Fan Favourite Singles Player
 Serena Williams
 Maria Sharapova
 Simona Halep
 Petra Kvitová
 Ana Ivanovic
 Agnieszka Radwańska
 Eugenie Bouchard
 Caroline Wozniacki
 Angelique Kerber
 Dominika Cibulková
 Ekaterina Makarova
 Andrea Petkovic
 Sara Errani
 Jelena Janković
 Venus Williams
 Alizé Cornet
 Garbiñe Muguruza
 Sabine Lisicki
 Victoria Azarenka

Fan Favourite Doubles Team
 Sara Errani &  Roberta Vinci 
 Su-Wei Hsieh &  Peng Shuai
 Cara Black &  Sania Mirza
 Ekaterina Makarova &  Elena Vesnina
 Racquel Kops-Jones &  Abigail Spears
 Květa Peschke &  Katarina Srebotnik
 Garbiñe Muguruza &  Carla Suárez Navarro
 Alla Kudryavtseva &  Anastasia Rodionova
 Martina Hingis &  Flavia Pennetta

Fan Favourite Player on Twitter
 Serena Williams
 Maria Sharapova
 Petra Kvitová
 Ana Ivanovic
 Eugenie Bouchard
 Caroline Wozniacki
 Andrea Petkovic
 Sara Errani
 Venus Williams
 Alizé Cornet
 Garbiñe Muguruza
 Sabine Lisicki
 Victoria Azarenka
 Sloane Stephens
 Monica Puig
 Laura Robson

Fan Favourite Player on Facebook
 Serena Williams
 Maria Sharapova
 Simona Halep
 Petra Kvitová
 Ana Ivanovic
 Agnieszka Radwańska
 Eugenie Bouchard
 Caroline Wozniacki
 Angelique Kerber
 Sara Errani
 Venus Williams
 Alizé Cornet
 Garbiñe Muguruza
 Sabine Lisicki
 Victoria Azarenka
 Monica Puig

Fan Favourite WTA Video of the Year
 USANA Game Faces
 Lucie Šafářová Indian Wells Hot Air Balloon
 Agnieszka Radwańska Fan Chat #AAHfancast | WTA Finals
 Dubai Duty Free Travel Show with Caroline Wozniacki
 Road to Singapore: The Series presented by Xerox | Episode 10
 2014 WTA Finals Best Moments()

Fan Favourite WTA Live Show of the Year
 Rio Open
 Family Circle Cup
 Pre-Wimbledon Party()
 Rogers Cup
 Western & Southern Open
 WTA Finals

Fan Favorite WTA Shot of the Year
 Angelique Kerber, 2014 Qatar Total Open semifinal (9%)
 Eugenie Bouchard, 2014 Portugal Open first round (15%) 
 Agnieszka Radwańska, 2014 Rogers Cup semifinal (45%)()
 Ana Ivanovic, 2014 Tokyo Open semifinal (31%)

Fan Favorite WTA Match of the Year
 Victoria Azarenka vs.  Jelena Janković, Brisbane
 Simona Halep vs.  Eugenie Bouchard, Indian Wells
 Dominika Cibulková vs.  Agnieszka Radwańska, Miami
 Maria Sharapova vs.  Simona Halep, Madrid
 Sara Errani vs.  Li Na, Rome
 Madison Keys vs.  Angelique Kerber, Eastbourne
 Venus Williams vs.  Angelique Kerber, Montreal
 Ana Ivanovic vs.  Maria Sharapova, Cincinnati
 Timea Bacsinszky vs.  Maria Sharapova, Wuhan
 Serena Williams vs.  Caroline Wozniacki, WTA Finals()

Fan Favorite Grand Slam Match of the Year
 Li Na vs.  Lucie Šafářová, Australian Open
 Agnieszka Radwańska vs.  Victoria Azarenka, Australian Open
 Svetlana Kuznetsova vs.  Petra Kvitová, French Open
 Maria Sharapova vs.  Simona Halep, French Open()
 Petra Kvitová vs.  Venus Williams, Wimbledon
 Angelique Kerber vs.  Maria Sharapova, Wimbledon
 Aleksandra Krunić vs.  Victoria Azarenka, US Open
 Caroline Wozniacki vs.  Maria Sharapova, US Open

Best Dress
 Serena Williams, US Open
 Agnieszka Radwańska, Rome
 Maria Sharapova, French Open
 Ana Ivanovic, French Open
 Jelena Janković, French Open
 Venus Williams, Wimbledon
 Caroline Wozniacki, Australian Open

Tweet of the Year
 Petra Kvitová
 Caroline Wozniacki
 Sabine Lisicki
 Serena Williams
 Maria Sharapova

Selfie of the Year
 Ana Ivanovic
 Heather Watson
 Caroline Wozniacki
 Eugenie Bouchard
 Maria Sharapova

Twitter Mirror Photo of the Year
  Halep,  Wozniacki,  Ivanovic,  Kvitová,  Radwańska &  Bouchard at WTA Finals Draw Ceremony
  Serena Williams at WTA Finals
  Simona Halep at WTA Finals
  Agnieszka &  Urszula Radwańska at WTA Pre-Wimbledon Party
  Li Na at WTA Pre-Wimbledon Party

Karen Krantzcke Sportsmanship Award
 Petra Kvitová

Peachy Kellmeyer Player Service Award
 Lucie Šafářová

References

Wta Awards
WTA Awards